Harsha may refer to:

 Harsha Vardhana (c. 590–647), Indian king
 Harsha (Chandela dynasty) (ruled c. 905-925 CE), Indian king
 Harsha (Paramara dynasty) (r. c. 949-972 CE), Indian king; better known as Siyaka
 Harsha Pala (ruled 1015-1035 ), Indian king
 Harsha of Kashmir (ruled 1089-1111 CE), Indian king
 Harsha (director) (b. 1980), Indian choreographer and director in the Kannada film industry
 Bill Harsha (1921-2010),  American politician

See also 
 Harsh Vardhan (disambiguation)
 Harcha